During the 1998–99 English football season, Norwich City F.C. competed in the Football League First Division.

Season summary
Norwich made a good start to the 1998–1999 campaign, with a 1–0 victory against East Anglia rivals Ipswich Town at Portman Road being the highlight and by Christmas 1998, the prospects of promotion back to the Premiership were looking good – but the club didn't win a home game again until 1 May. During the season on 18 March 1999, ambiguous midfielder Keith O'Neill joined Middlesbrough for a fee of £700,000.

Off the field on 17 December 1998, there were slight changes in the boardroom where Bob Cooper replaced Barry Lockwood as club chairman.

Final league table

Results
Norwich City's score comes first

Legend

Football League First Division

FA Cup

League Cup

Players

First-team squad
Squad at end of season

Notes

References

Norwich City F.C. seasons
Norwich City